The inaugural US Open men's doubles tennis tournament, in 1881, was reserved for United States National Lawn Tennis Association (USNLTA) club members and was won by Clarence Clark and  Frederick Winslow Taylor.  The following year, 1882, the championships opened to international competitors. Between 1890 and 1906 sectional tournaments were held in the east and the west of the country to determine the best two doubles teams, which competed in a play-off in Newport to see who would play the defending champions in the challenge round. The challenge system was abolished in 1920.  The doubles event was held in various locations; Newport (1881–1914), Forest Hills (1915–1916, 1942–1945, 1968–1977), Longwood (1917–1933, 1935–1941, 1946–1967) and Germantown, Philadelphia (1934) before it settled in 1978 at the USTA National Tennis Center, now the USTA Billie Jean King National Tennis Center, in New York City.

Champions

U.S. National Championships

The following pairings won the U.S. Open tennis championship, or its predecessor United States National tennis championship, in Men's Doubles.

US Open

Statistics

Multiple champions

See also

U.S. Open other competitions
List of US Open men's singles champions
List of US Open women's singles champions
List of US Open women's doubles champions
List of US Open mixed doubles champions

Grand Slam men's doubles
List of Australian Open men's doubles champions
List of French Open men's doubles champions
List of Wimbledon gentlemen's doubles champions
List of Grand Slam men's doubles champions

References

External links
List of US Open Men's Doubles champions
US Open Doubles records

Men
US Open men's doubles champions
US Open